The 1902 Ursinus football team was an American football team that represented Ursinus College during the 1902 college football season. The team compiled a perfect 9–0 record and outscored opponents by a total of 194 to 20. Edward E. Kelley was the head coach.

Schedule

References

Ursinus
Ursinus Bears football seasons
College football undefeated seasons
Ursinus football